La Playa or La Playa de Belén is a Colombian municipality in the department of North Santander.

La Playa is among Colombia's most-atmospheric and best-preserved 19th-century pueblos. It was named a Pueblo Patrimonio (heritage town) of Colombia in 2010, one of only 11 municipalities nationwide that were selected to be part of the Red Turística de Pueblos Patrimonio original cohort.

References

  Government of Norte de Santander - La Playa
  La Playa de Belen official website

Municipalities of the Norte de Santander Department